Scandium(III) nitrate, Sc(NO3)3, is an ionic compound. It is an oxidizer, as all nitrates are. The salt is applied in optical coatings, catalysts, electronic ceramics and the laser industry.

References

Scandium compounds
Nitrates